Paul Meier (born 27 July 1971 in Velbert) is former German decathlete who won a bronze medal at the 1993 World Championships in Athletics in Stuttgart where he set a personal best of 8548 points. A year earlier he had finished in sixth place at the 1992 Summer Olympics.

At the 1996 European Cup for Decathlon in Lage, Meier injured himself in the long jump and was unable to participate in the 1996 Summer Olympics in Atlanta. His personal best of 8548 points ranks him seventh among German decathletes, behind Jürgen Hingsen, Uwe Freimuth, Siegfried Wentz, Frank Busemann, Torsten Voss and Guido Kratschmer. 

On 30 April 2004 he married high jumper Heike Henkel.

Achievements

External links

1971 births
Living people
German decathletes
Athletes (track and field) at the 1992 Summer Olympics
Olympic athletes of Germany
World Athletics Championships medalists
People from Velbert
Sportspeople from Düsseldorf (region)